Greg Gall (born December 29, 1965 in Tampa, Florida) is a drummer, formerly with the death metal band, Six Feet Under. He does not play the classic death metal style of drumming (blast beats). He uses more of a traditional drum approach, but with the addition of speed, and has very quick feet on the double bass pedals. 
 
Gall is married and has one child, and is the brother-in-law to bandmate Terry Butler.

Discography

Six Feet Under
 Haunted (1995)
 Alive and Dead (1996)
 Warpath (1997)
 Maximum Violence (1999)
 Graveyard Classics (2000)
 True Carnage (2001)
 Bringer of Blood (2003)
 Graveyard Classics 2 (2004)
 13 (2005)
 Commandment (2007)
 Death Rituals (2008)
 Graveyard Classics 3 (2010)

References

External links
 

1965 births
Living people
American heavy metal drummers
Musicians from Tampa, Florida
American male guitarists
20th-century American drummers
American male drummers
20th-century American guitarists
Six Feet Under (band) members
20th-century American male musicians